Ulf Kliche (born 7 August 1969) is a German former professional footballer who played as a defender.

References

External links

1969 births
Living people
People from Flensburg
German footballers
Footballers from Schleswig-Holstein
Association football defenders
2. Bundesliga players
FC Bayern Munich II players
FC Bayern Munich footballers
VfB Oldenburg players
TuS Hoisdorf players
SV Wilhelmshaven players